Nahr-e Abu Azim (also Romanized as Nahr-e Abū ‘Aẕīm; also known as Abū ‘Aẕīm) is a village in Nasar Rural District, Arvandkenar District, Abadan County, Khuzestan Province, Iran. At the 2006 census, its population was 308, in 48 families.

References 

Populated places in Abadan County